Shetaye Sisay Abaa (born 30 June 1988) is an Ethiopian footballer who plays for C.B.E and the Ethiopia national team.

She scored for Ethiopia in a 2012 African Women's Championship qualification match against Egypt.

She played for Ethiopia at the 2012 African Women's Championship.

References

1988 births
Living people
Ethiopian women's footballers
Ethiopia women's international footballers
Women's association football forwards